Giancarlo Zolezzi Seoane (born August 27, 1981) is a Chilean former swimmer, who specialized in long-distance freestyle events. He is a multiple-time Chilean swimming champion and record holder in the 200, 400, 800, and 1500 m freestyle.

Zolezzi made his official debut at the 2000 Summer Olympics in Sydney, where he competed in the 400 m freestyle. Swimming in heat one, he raced to second place and fortieth overall by 0.17 of a second behind Singapore's Sng Ju Wei in 4:01.51.

At the 2004 Summer Olympics in Athens, Zolezzi extended his program, swimming in three individual events. He posted FINA B-standard entry times of 1:52.47 (200 m freestyle), 3:57.89 (400 m freestyle), and 15:55.89 (1500 m freestyle) from the Pan American Games in Santo Domingo, Dominican Republic, and World Championships in Barcelona, Spain. On the first day of the Games, Zolezzi placed twenty-fifth in the 400 m freestyle. He blasted a new Chilean record of 3:56.52 to top the second heat against seven other swimmers, including early favorites Moss Burmester of New Zealand and Petar Stoychev of Bulgaria.

By the following day, Zolezzi took a sixth spot and thirty-ninth overall in heat four of the 200 m freestyle. He posted a time of 1:53.18, just 0.71 of a second off his entry and record time. In the 1500 m freestyle, Zolezzi touched second in heat one behind Thailand's Charnvudth Saengsri by a 6.06-second margin in 16:00.52. Zolezzi failed to advance into the final, as he placed primerisimo overall in the preliminaries.

References

1981 births
Living people
Chilean male freestyle swimmers
Pan American Games competitors for Chile
Olympic swimmers of Chile
Swimmers at the 1999 Pan American Games
Swimmers at the 2000 Summer Olympics
Swimmers at the 2003 Pan American Games
Swimmers at the 2004 Summer Olympics
Sportspeople from Santiago
21st-century Chilean people